Mesih, more commonly and officially referred to as The Messiah, but also referred to as 'Jesus', Good Tidings of the Savior Jesus, the Spirit of God is a 2007 film from the Islamic Republic of Iran, directed by Nader Talebzadeh (1953—2022), depicting the life of Jesus from an Islamic perspective, based not only on the canonical gospels, but also the Qur'an, and, it would seem, the Gospel of Barnabas. The latter conforms to the Islamic interpretation of the origins of Christianity. Iranian actor Ahmad Soleimani Nia plays the role of Jesus. Some Islamic organizations cite it in support of the Islamic view of Jesus.

Talebzadeh said of The Passion of the Christ, "Gibson's film is a very good film. I mean that it is a well-crafted movie but the story is wrong." The film has two endings, one from the Christian Bible and one from the Qur'an.

It is a two-hour-plus feature film and a TV series shot for Iranian TV.

Cast
Ahmad Soleimani Nia - Jesus
Valiollah Momeni
Ahmad Najafi
Fathali Oveisi
Morteza Zarabi - Judas

Crew
Director of Photography: Sadegh Mianji
Sound: Seyed Jalal Hosseini
Set & Costume Designer: Ahmad Soleimani-Nia
Make-up Designer: Morteza Zarrabi
Executive Producer: Abdollah Saeedi
Production Assistant: Saeed Kazemi
Photographer: Saeed Sourati
Music: Loris Tjeknavorian

Series
The movie has been adapted into a television series and shown on Iranian TV. Variety stated that "With over 1,000 actors and extras, it is one of the largest film productions ever attempted in Iran.

The longer version of the film is airing as 20 45-minute episodes after a theatrical version is released here." The series is being dubbed in many languages including Arabic for showing on Arab television stations.

A showing of the series based on the film by two Lebanese television stations Al-Manar and National Broadcasting Network during the Holy month of Ramadan was suspended after the broadcast of one initial episode, as the Christian religious authorities in the country demanded broadcasts to be suspended because many portrayals in the film contradict with traditional Christian church beliefs about Jesus. These were scheduled broadcasts in a series adapted to television and dubbed into Arabic and shown on many Arab television stations during Ramadan. The film portrays Jesus as a prophet and not as the Son of God and claims he was not crucified and that someone else was crucified in his place. Talebzadeh's biopic shows Judas Iscariot being crucified instead of Jesus. Many Christians believe Jesus is the Son of God and thus part of the Holy Trinity and that he died by crucifixion to accomplish humanity's salvation before resurrecting and ascending to heaven.

Awards and festivals
The film was played at the Philadelphia Film Festival. The 2007 Religion Today Film Festival in Italy has given the movie an award for promoting interfaith understanding.

See also
 List of Islamic films
Saint Mary (Iranian film)
The Kingdom of Solomon
Iranian cinema

Notes and references

External links
 
 

Iranian television series
Iranian television films
2007 films
Films about Jesus
Portrayals of Jesus on television
2000s Iranian television series
2007 Iranian television series debuts
Films based on the Quran
Cultural depictions of Judas Iscariot